F. maxima may refer to:

 Ficus maxima, a fig tree
 Fissurella maxima, a keyhole limpet